France are competing at the 2014 European Athletics Championships in Zürich, Switzerland, from 12 to 17 August 2014. In the men's 3000 metres steeplechase, Mahiedine Mekhissi-Benabbad won the race, but he was later disqualified after he took off his shirt while running down the home straight. The gold was then awarded to Yoann Kowal.

Medals

Results

 Men 
 Track and road

Field events

Combined events – Decathlon

Women
 Track and road

Field events

Combined events – Heptathlon

References

Nations at the 2014 European Athletics Championships
France at the European Athletics Championships
European Athletics Championships